4 Elements is the second album by the American alternative rock band Chronic Future. It was released on September 22, 2000. The album received poor ratings in general, though certain songs were praised, including "Jump to Jive" and "The Majik". 4 Elements had a far more mature sound than Chronic Future, as the band members were older, though the less-mature sound of Chronic Future proved more popular.

Track listing

Personnel

Members
Mike Busse – lead vocals, backing vocals
Ben Collins – lead vocals, guitar, backing vocals
Brandon Lee – bass guitar, backing vocals
Barry Collins – drums, percussion

References 

2000 albums
Chronic Future albums